Sievierodonetsk Power Station (also known as Sievierodonetsk TEC) is a thermal power station at Sievierodonetsk in Luhansk Oblast, Ukraine.  It went in service in 1952 and is the heat supplier of Azot works in Sievierodonetsk.  It has installed power capacity of 150 MW.

See also

 List of power stations in Ukraine

Energy infrastructure completed in 1952
Coal-fired power stations in Ukraine
Cogeneration power stations in Ukraine
Sievierodonetsk
Buildings and structures destroyed during the 2022 Russian invasion of Ukraine